Shreya Ghoshal (born 12 March 1984) is an Indian playback singer. She has sung professionally in over 20 languages including Hindi, Bengali, Kannada, Telugu, Tamil, Malayalam, Marathi, Odia, Assamese, Nepali, Bhojpuri, French, Urdu, Sanskrit, Tulu, Gujarati, Punjabi,Tiwa, Rajasthani & Braj Bhasha. She also sang few songs for live concerts in Malaysian, Sinhala, Swahili, English, Konkani and Ladakhi languages. languages.

Ghoshal's career began when she won the Sa Re Ga Ma Pa contest as an adult. Her Bollywood playback singing career began with Sanjay Leela Bhansali's Devdas for which she received her first National Film Award for Best Female Playback Singer along with Filmfare Award for Best Female Playback Singer and Filmfare RD Burman Award for New Music Talent. She sang more than 2405 songs in 20+ languages and especially in Hindi she sang 1100+ songs.

Hindi film songs

2002

2003

2004

2005

2006

2007

2008

2009

2010

2011

2012

2013

2014

2015

2016

2017

2018

2019

2020

2021

2022

2023

Unreleased Hindi songs

Hindi albums and singles

Hindi television songs

See also
 Filmography of Shreya Ghoshal
 List of awards and nominations received by Shreya Ghoshal

Notes

External links 

 Music Gallery at Official Website
 
 
 
 

Lists of songs recorded by Indian singers